Lou Xia (born 17 March 1972) is a Chinese swimmer. She competed in two events at the 1992 Summer Olympics.

References

1972 births
Living people
Chinese female breaststroke swimmers
Olympic swimmers of China
Swimmers at the 1992 Summer Olympics
Place of birth missing (living people)
20th-century Chinese women
21st-century Chinese women